Remains is the sixth studio album by Canadian heavy metal band Annihilator, released on July 21, 1997 by Music For Nations and CMC International. All instruments were performed by Jeff Waters following the dissolution of the previous line-up. However, John Bates and Dave Steele make an appearance on "No Love" on guitars and vocals respectively, with Steele also appearing on "Wind". The album features a more industrial-oriented sound and also features a drum machine. Remains was the last album for 18 years (until Suicide Society) to feature lead vocals by Waters on an Annihilator album.

Track listing

Personnel
 Jeff Waters - guitars, bass, vocals and drum programming
 John Bates - some guitar on "No Love"
 Dave Steele - some vocals on "No Love" and "Wind"

References

1997 albums
Annihilator (band) albums
CMC International albums
Music for Nations albums